Atsushi Matsumoto (born 24 March 1988) is a Japanese freestyle wrestler. In 2018, he won one of the bronze medals in the 92 kg event at the 2018 World Wrestling Championships held in Budapest, Hungary. He also competed in Greco-Roman wrestling in 2017, winning the silver medal in the 85 kg event at the 2017 Asian Wrestling Championships held in New Delhi, India.

Career 

In 2010, he competed in the men's freestyle 84 kg event at the 2010 Asian Games in Guangzhou, China without winning a medal. He was eliminated from the competition in his first match by Muhammad Inam of Pakistan.

In 2019, he won one of the bronze medals in the men's 92 kg event at the 2019 Asian Wrestling Championships held in Xi'an, China.

Major results

References

External links 
 

Living people
1988 births
Place of birth missing (living people)
Japanese male sport wrestlers
World Wrestling Championships medalists
Wrestlers at the 2010 Asian Games
Asian Games competitors for Japan
Asian Wrestling Championships medalists
21st-century Japanese people